Tamás Huszák (born October 2, 1988 in Miskolc) is a Hungarian football (midfielder) player who currently plays for Debreceni VSC.

References

1988 births
Living people
Sportspeople from Miskolc
Hungarian footballers
Association football midfielders
Diósgyőri VTK players
Debreceni VSC players
BFC Siófok players
FC Tatabánya players
Nyíregyháza Spartacus FC players
Nemzeti Bajnokság I players